Kim Sang-joong (born August 6, 1965) is a South Korean actor. He is best known for starring in the television dramas My Husband's Woman (2007), City Hunter (2011), and The Chaser (2012). He won the Grand Prize at the MBC Drama Awards for his performance in the historical television series The Rebel (2017).

Career
Before becoming an actor, Kim Sang-joong was enlisted in the Marine Corps. But after graduating from Dongguk University with a degree in Theater and Film, he embarked on an acting career at age 25. Kim made his acting debut in the stage play I Love Bread in 1990, and was one of the co-founders of the theater troupe  Extreme Legend. He soon transitioned to film and television, and became known for his distinctive voice and confident and charismatic acting, often as morally ambiguous characters. Among his notable roles in television dramas include a middle-aged man having an affair with his wife's best friend in My Husband's Woman (2007), the titular besieged monarch in Eight Days, Assassination Attempts against King Jeongjo (2007), a former agent who trains his foster son as a weapon in his plans for revenge in City Hunter (2011), and a presidential candidate willing to go to any lengths to win, including murder and cover-up, in The Chaser (2012).

On the big screen, Kim was praised for his comic acting in the gangster comedy My Boss, My Teacher (2006), and has also starred in arthouse films directed by Hong Sang-soo, such as The Day He Arrives (2011) and Our Sunhi (2013).

Since 2008, Kim has hosted Unanswered Questions, a long-running program with a similar format to Unsolved Mysteries.

Personal life
Kim is the third child among six siblings, and has two brothers and three sisters. He married in 1991, but he and his wife divorced in 1999. They have one son, born in 1993.

Filmography

Film

Television series

Hosting

Theater

Awards and nominations

References

External links
 
 
 

20th-century South Korean male actors
21st-century South Korean male actors
South Korean male television actors
South Korean male film actors
1965 births
Living people
People from Busan
Dongguk University alumni
Republic of Korea Marine Corps personnel
Gwangsan Kim clan